The 1951 Misrair SNCASE Languedoc crash occurred on 22 December 1951 when a SNCASE Languedoc of Misrair crashed whilst attempting to land at Tehran Airport, Iran during a snowstorm. All 22 people on board were killed. The aircraft was operating an international scheduled passenger flight from Baghdad Airport, Iraq to Tehran.

Aircraft
The accident aircraft was SNCASE Languedoc msn 41, registration SU-AHH.

Accident
All five crew and fifteen passengers on board were killed. The aircraft is reported to have circled Tehran four times before contact was lost with the control tower at about 8pm local time. It was assumed that the aircraft had returned to Baghdad. The wreckage was subsequently discovered the next day in a ravine. There were seventeen passengers listed, but two of them did not board the flight in Baghdad. Amongst the casualties was American Henry G. Bennett, director of the Technical Cooperation Administration (TCA), which oversaw the Point Four Program. Three other TCA members also died.

References

Aviation accidents and incidents in 1951
Aviation accidents and incidents in Iran
1951 in Iran
December 1951 events in Asia
20th century in Tehran